Grombalia Secondary School is a Tunisian high school; it opened in 1964–65.

References 

Educational institutions established in 1964
Schools in Tunisia
1964 establishments in Tunisia